Barton Elliott "Barty" Smith (born March 23, 1952) is a former fullback for the National Football League from Richmond, Virginia.

High school
He graduated from Douglas Freeman High School where he was a four-sport star.  Smith was selected as the Virginia High School Player of the Year in 1969.  That same year he achieved the highest honor awarded to high school athletes when he was named to the Sunkist High School All-American Football Team.

College career
Smith played football for the University of Richmond where he was recognized as one of the nations best all-around fullbacks.  He starred in football at the University of Richmond from 1971 through 1973, twice being named to the All Southern Conference Football Team.  Recognized as one of the all time Spider greats, Smith led the University of Richmond to the Southern Conference Title and an appearance in the Tangerine Bowl.  He was the leader of the only Spider grid squad to be ranked in the Division 1 Top 20.
 
In 1972, Barty Smith was named as the recipient of the Jacobs Blocking Trophy presented to the Outstanding Blocker in the Southern Conference—an award which he repeated in 1973.  He became the fourth Richmond Spider to be honored since the award’s inception in 1933.  In his senior year, Smith won the Coffman Award, representative of the Most Valuable Player in the East-West Shrine Game in San Francisco.  He ranks 8th on the University of Richmond’s rushing list with 1,941 yards and career touchdowns with 15. 
 
In 1976, Smith was inducted into the University of Richmond Athletic Hall of Fame. In 1990, he was named to the University of Richmond All-Time Football Team and was inducted into the Virginia High School Hall of Fame in 1998.

Professional career

After concluding a stellar career for the University of Richmond, Barty Smith was a first-round draft choice of the Green Bay Packers in 1974.  He played with Green Bay from 1974 until 1980.  Smith ranks 16th on the Packers all-time rushing list with 1,942 yards, scoring 18 career touchdowns. He won Packer Offensive Player of the Year honors in 1977.

References

1952 births
Living people
American football running backs
Richmond Spiders football players
Green Bay Packers players
Players of American football from Richmond, Virginia